Bill Horsman is a British slalom canoeist who competed from the late 1980s to the mid-1990s. He won two medals in the C-1 team event at the ICF Canoe Slalom World Championships with a silver in 1993 and a bronze in 1991.

References
ICF medalists for Olympic and World Championships - Part 2: rest of flatwater (now sprint) and remaining canoeing disciplines: 1936-2007.

British male canoeists
Living people
Year of birth missing (living people)
Medalists at the ICF Canoe Slalom World Championships